KEDT-FM 90.3 MHz (branded as "KEDT Public Radio") is an FM public broadcasting radio station that serves the Corpus Christi, Texas area. It is under ownership of The South Texas Public Broadcasting System. Originally signing on in 1982 as KKED-FM in 1993 it changed its call letters to KEDT to match that of KEDT-TV.

Programming is also heard on KVRT 90.7 FM in Victoria, which was launched in 1993 to provide Victoria area listeners a National Public Radio Station.

See also
 KEDT (TV)

External links
KEDT official website

NPR member stations
Texas classical music
EDT-FM